The 2021–22 Division Excellence was the 85th season of the Division Excellence, the highest premier basketball league in Morocco. The defending champions were AS Salé.

The season started on 21 November 2021 and ended on 30 June 2022. Salé won the championship, their 9th title and their 7th in a row (not counting abandoned seasons).

Teams

Team changes 

Raja CA, Majd Tanger and Atletic Beni Snassen were promoted to the league. Olympique de Safi, Amal Riadi El Hajeb and ASE Essaouira were relegated from the previous season.

Arenas and locations

Regular season

Group South

Source: FRMBB

Group North

Playoff round
In the playoff round, the four highest-placed teams from each regular season group play each other in two groups. The top two teams from both groups advance to the semifinals.

Group A

Group B

Classification round

5th and 6th place game

7th and 8th place game

9th and 10th place game

11th and 12th place game

Semifinals and finals
The semifinals are played in a two-legged series, the finals are played in a best-of-three playoff format.

Finals

References

External links
FRMBB website

Division Excellence
Morocco